The Nokia N1 is an Android-powered tablet developed by Nokia. Unveiled on 18 November 2014, it is Nokia's first mobile device since the sale of its original mobile phone business to Microsoft earlier in the year. It was released in China on 7 January 2015.

Development 
According to Nokia's product chief Sebastian Nystrom,  work on the tablet began on 28 April just days after the acquisition of its former mobile phone division by Microsoft. The unveiling of the N1 came shortly after an announcement on 17 November 2014 by Nokia technologies head Ramzi Haidamus that the company would begin to contract the manufacturing of future Nokia products to third-party companies, to ensure a continued consumer presence for the "valuable" Nokia brand. As part of the sale, Nokia is subject to non-compete clauses forbidding it from producing Nokia-branded smartphones until the end of 2015, and feature phones for 10 years after the closure of the Microsoft sale, but is still free to produce devices in other product segments, such as tablets.

The N1 was ultimately unveiled the next day at the Slush conference. While using Nokia's design, technology, and logo under license, Foxconn will be responsible for manufacturing, marketing, distribution, and technical support for the N1, and not Nokia.

The N1 is the first tablet on the market to use the new reversible USB-C connector; although the new design is part of the updated USB 3.1 specification, the N1 only supports USB 2.0 speeds. In response to this regression, a Nokia spokesperson stated that "our partner didn’t have access to that kind of solution on the chipset that we’re building the device on. It’s just a pure question of having the availability. We believe that the reversible connector is an easier way, and of course the chipset from Intel is quite capable and we wanted to maximize the capability there, but the 3.1 USB capability was not available for this chipset at this time."

Specifications 
The overall design and hardware specifications of the N1 are very similar to the iPad Mini 3, featuring an aluminium unibody chassis, a laminated 7.9-inch IPS LCD display, a 64-bit, 2.4 GHz quad-core Intel Atom system-on-chip with 2 GB of RAM, and 32 GB of internal storage. The N1 includes an 8-megapixel rear-facing camera, and a 5-megapixel front-facing camera.

The N1 runs an otherwise stock distribution of Android 5.0 "Lollipop", but includes an alternative home screen known as Z Launcher. Z Launcher emphasizes the use of gestures for navigation; users can search for applications or contacts by tracing letters onto the device's screen. Z Launcher was also released via Google Play Store for Android smartphones, but the tablet version is exclusive to the N1. The N1 is the first Nokia-branded device to officially support Google Mobile Services and ship with access to Google Play Store; the discontinued Nokia X series used a fork of Android, the Nokia X software platform, which substituted Google's proprietary software with similar apps from Nokia and Microsoft, and used a Nokia-specific application store.

Release 
The N1 was released in China on 7 January 2015. The product was deemed a success, the first batch selling 20,000 units in just 4 minutes. The second batch also had a quick sellout, so a third and fourth batch for China was released in February, with a release in European countries to follow. In May 2015, Nokia N1 was launched in Taiwan. It is unknown whether the N1 will be released in any other regions.

See also
Z Launcher
Nokia Lumia 2520
Nokia 6
Nokia T20

References

External links 
 

Nokia Internet tablets
Android (operating system) devices
Tablet computers introduced in 2014
Tablet computers
Touchscreen portable media players